William Henry Cottrell (born September 18, 1944) is a former American football offensive lineman who played five seasons in the National Football League (NFL) for the Detroit Lions and Denver Broncos. He also played for the Richmond Rebels. His brother is Ted Cottrell.

References

1944 births
Detroit Lions players
Denver Broncos players
Players of American football from Pennsylvania
Living people
Richmond Rebels players
Delaware Valley Aggies football players
Sportspeople from Chester, Pennsylvania
American football offensive linemen